Pyreferra is a genus of moths of the family Noctuidae.

Species
 Pyreferra ceromatica (Grote, 1874)
 Pyreferra citrombra Franclemont, 1941
 Pyreferra hesperidago (Guenée, 1852)
 Pyreferra pettiti (Grote, 1874)

References
Natural History Museum Lepidoptera genus database
Pyreferra at funet

Cuculliinae